Seif Kadhim Husayn (born 7 February 1991) is a Swedish footballer of Iraqi descent who plays as a midfielder for Assyriska IK. Born in Sweden, Kadhim played in Allsvenskan for Örgryte IS, and Superettan for Örgryte IS and Umeå FC.

Career

Club career
In December 2017, it was confirmed that Kadhim had joined Umeå FC. On 13 January 2020, Kadhim then moved to Swedish Division 1 Södra club Assyriska IK.

References

External links

Seif Kadhim at Fotbolltransfers

1991 births
Living people
Swedish footballers
Association football midfielders
Örgryte IS players
Umeå FC players
Duhok SC players
Allsvenskan players
Superettan players
Swedish people of Iraqi descent
Syrianska IF Kerburan players